Trachypus is a genus of wasps in the family Crabronidae. There are more than 30 described species in Trachypus.

Species
These 31 species belong to the genus Trachypus:

 Trachypus annulatus Spinola, 1851
 Trachypus basalis F. Smith, 1873
 Trachypus batrachostomus Schrottky, 1909
 Trachypus boharti Rubio-Espina, 1975
 Trachypus caenosus Rubio-Espina, 1975
 Trachypus cementarius (F. Smith, 1860)
 Trachypus cisminutus Rubio-Espina, 1975
 Trachypus clypeatus Rubio-Espina, 1975
 Trachypus denticollis Spinola, 1851
 Trachypus disjunctus F. Smith, 1873
 Trachypus elongatus (Fabricius, 1804)
 Trachypus fasciatus Rubio-Espina, 1975
 Trachypus flavidus (Taschenberg, 1875)
 Trachypus fulvipennis (Taschenberg, 1875)
 Trachypus gerstaeckeri Dewitz, 1881
 Trachypus gracilis (Cameron, 1890)
 Trachypus hirticeps (Cameron, 1890)
 Trachypus mandibularis Rubio-Espina, 1975
 Trachypus mexicanus de Saussure, 1867
 Trachypus miles Schrottky, 1909
 Trachypus minutus Rubio-Espina, 1975
 Trachypus patagonensis (de Saussure, 1854)
 Trachypus peruviensis Rubio-Espina, 1975
 Trachypus petiolatus (Spinola, 1842)
 Trachypus romandi (de Saussure, 1854)
 Trachypus soniae Rubio-Espina, 1975
 Trachypus spegazzinii Brèthes, 1910
 Trachypus spinosus Rubio-Espina, 1975
 Trachypus stictosus Rubio-Espina, 1975
 Trachypus taschenbergi Rubio-Espina, 1975
 Trachypus varius (Taschenberg, 1875)

References

Crabronidae
Articles created by Qbugbot